Crocker Mountains is a mountain range in West Coast Division of Sabah, Malaysia that separates the west and east coast of Sabah.

Geology 
The mountain range is made up of uplifted and folded sedimentary rocks consisted of weathered soft sandstones and shales. Most of the park boundary lies above  with its lowlands used for cash crops and paddy field. The park area is important as a water catchment to supply water into various river in the west coast and interior districts of Sabah including Papar River, Kimanis River, Bongawan River, Membakut River, Padas River and Melalap River that flow west to the park while the Pegalan River, Pampang River, Apin-Apin River, Tendulu River, Melalap River, Liawan River and Tikalod River flow the opposite direction.

History 
The area surrounding Mount Kinabalu has been a state park since 1964 and was the country's first World Heritage Site. Part of the mountain range has been gazetted for protection as Crocker Range National Park since 1984. Through the Bornean Biodiversity and Ecosystems Conservation Programme (BBEC), a technical co-operation existed between the government of Sabah and Japan International Cooperation Agency (JICA) to innovate Community Use Zone (CUZ) concept as a management option to address the issues concerning indigenous communities living and utilising resources within the protected areas. Mount Kinabalu, one of the highest mountains in Southeast Asia, is a part of this mountain range. In 2014, the range was recognised as a UNESCO Biosphere Reserve, becoming the second Malaysian site to be designated, after Chini Lake in the Malay Peninsula of Pahang.

Biodiversity 
The Crocker Mountains Forest Reserve area has a wide range of flora and fauna diversity and having the highest diversity of nocturnal insects in all the 20 forest reserves surveyed within the Heart of Borneo area in Sabah and recorded a number of endemic species.

References

External links 
 

 
Mountain ranges of Malaysia
Landforms of Sabah
Biosphere reserves of Malaysia
Borneo montane rain forests